Syntomaula is a genus of moths in the family Cosmopterigidae.

Species
Syntomaula cana Moriuti, 1977
Syntomaula microsperma Diakonoff, 1954
Syntomaula simulatella Walker, 1864
Syntomaula tephrota Meyrick, 1914

References
Natural History Museum Lepidoptera genus database

Cosmopteriginae